Oslin may refer to:

George P. Oslin (1899–1996), reporter, executive at Western Union and author on the history of telecommunication
K. T. Oslin (1942–2020), American country music singer and songwriter
Sidney Oslin Smith Jr. (1923–2012), former United States federal judge

See also
Osolin
Ossolin (disambiguation)
Asselin
Uuslinn